This is a list of shopping malls in Pennsylvania:

Outlet Malls
Cranberry Mall – Cranberry Twp.
Gettysburg Village Outlets – Gettysburg
Grove City Premium Outlets – Grove City
The Outlets at Wind Creek Bethlehem – Bethlehem
Philadelphia Mills – Philadelphia
Philadelphia Premium Outlets – Limerick
Pocono Premium Outlets (formerly The Crossings Premium Outlets) – Tannersville
The Shop @Rockvale – Lancaster
Tanger Factory Outlets – Hershey
Tanger Factory Outlets – Lancaster
Tanger Factory Outlets – Washington
The Outlets at Wind Creek Bethlehem – Bethlehem
VF Outlet Village – Reading

Defunct

References

Shopping malls in Pennsylvania
Pennsylvania
Shopping malls